Lights Out with David Spade was an American late-night talk show hosted by David Spade. Premiering on Comedy Central on July 29, 2019, the series features discussions on popular culture topics between Spade and a rotating panel of guest comedians, as well as other filmed segments.

History
The series was scheduled as a lead-out for The Daily Show; since the conclusion of The Colbert Report, the timeslot had seen several short-lived attempts at Daily Show spin-offs focusing on other cast members, such as The Nightly Show with Larry Wilmore and The Opposition with Jordan Klepper, which both faced low viewership.

Lights Out marked the first Comedy Central program in the 11:30 timeslot to not be a news comedy program or be hosted by an alumnus of The Daily Show; network president Kent Alterman argued that viewers were being fatigued by the extensive focus on politics and the Trump administration on other late night shows, with Spade saying that his show would focus more on "cultural events and some Hollywood stuff, [and] weird stories in the news" rather than primarily focus on political humor.

In March 2020, production was halted due to the COVID-19 pandemic. On April 3, 2020, Comedy Central announced that they would not renew Lights Out, but that it was open to selling the show to another network; the program had only been able to retain roughly half of its audience from The Daily Show (which, as a partial replacement, began producing expanded 45-minute episodes beginning April 27).

Episodes

2019

July/August

September

October

November

December

2020

January

February

March

See also
 The Opposition with Jordan Klepper, predecessor in timeslot
 The Nightly Show with Larry Wilmore, predecessor in timeslot
 The Colbert Report, predecessor in timeslot

References

External links
 

2019 American television series debuts
2020 American television series endings
2010s American late-night television series
2020s American late-night television series
2010s American television talk shows
2020s American television talk shows
English-language television shows
Comedy Central late-night programming
Television productions cancelled due to the COVID-19 pandemic